Species use restricted ecological niches, and the niches of all species are segregated, often with much overlap, by the use of different habitats, different geographic areas and seasons, and different food resources, to mention only a few of the many niche dimensions. The causes of niche restriction and segregation are important problems in evolutionary ecology.

Background
Two ecological paradigms deal with the problem. The first paradigm predominates in what may be called “classical” ecology. It assumes that niche space is largely saturated with individuals and species, leading to strong competition. Niches are restricted because “neighbouring” species, i.e., species with similar ecological characteristics such as similar habitats or food preferences, prevent expansion into other niches or even narrow niches down. This continual struggle for existence is an important assumption of natural selection introduced by Darwin as an explanation for evolution.

The other paradigm assumes that niche space is to a large degree vacant, i.e., that there are many vacant niches. It is based on many empirical studies  and theoretical investigations especially of Kauffman 1993. Causes of vacant niches may be evolutionary contingencies or brief or long-lasting environmental disturbances.

Both paradigms agree that species are never “universal” in the sense that they occupy all possible niches; they are always specialized, although the degree of specialization varies. For example, there is no universal parasite which infects all host species and microhabitats within or on them. However, the degree of host specificity varies strongly. Thus, Toxoplasma (Protista) infects numerous vertebrates including humans, Enterobius vermicularis infects only humans.

The following mechanisms for niche restriction and segregation have been proposed:

Niche restriction 

 Species must be specialized in order to survive. They may survive for a while in less optimal habitats under favourable conditions, but they will be extinguished when conditions become less favourable, for example due to changed weather conditions (this aspect was especially emphasized by Price 1983).
 Niches remain narrow or become narrower as the result of natural selection in order to enhance the chances of mating. This “mating theory of niche restriction”  is supported by the observation that niches of asexual stages are often wider than those of sexually mature stages; that niches become narrower at the time of mating; and that microhabitats of sessile species and of species with small population sizes often are narrower than those of non-sessile species and of species with large population sizes.

Niche segregation 

 The random selection of niches in largely empty niche space will often automatically lead to segregation (this mechanism is of particular importance in the second paradigm).
 Niches are segregated due to interspecific competition (this mechanism is of particular importance in the first paradigm).
 Niches of similar species are segregated (as the result of natural selection) in order to prevent interspecific hybridisation, because hybrids are less fit. (Many cases of niche segregation explained by interspecific competition are better explained by this mechanism, i.e., “reinforcement of reproductive barriers”) (e.g., Rohde 2005b).

Relative significance of the mechanisms

Both paradigms acknowledge a role for all mechanisms (except possibly for that of random selection of niches in the first paradigm), but emphasis on the various mechanisms varies. The first paradigm stresses the paramount importance of interspecific competition, whereas the second paradigm tries to explain many cases which are thought to be due to competition in the first paradigm, by reinforcement of reproductive barriers and/or random selection of niches. – Many authors believe in the overriding importance of interspecific competition. Intuitively, one would expect that interspecific competition is of particular importance in all those cases in which sympatric species (i.e., species occurring together in the same area) with large population densities use the same resources and largely exhaust them. However, Andrewartha and Birch (1954,1984) and others have pointed out that most natural populations usually don’t even approach exhaustion of resources, and too much emphasis on interspecific competition is therefore wrong. Concerning the possibility that competition has led to segregation in the evolutionary past, Wiens (1974, 1984) concluded that such assumptions cannot be proven, and Connell (1980) found that interspecific competition as a mechanism of niche segregation has been proven only for some pest insects. Barker (1983), in his review of competition in Drosophila and related genera, which are among the best known animal groups, concluded that the idea of niche segregation by interspecific competition is attractive, but that no study has yet been able to show a mechanism responsible for segregation. Without specific evidence, the possibility of random segregation can never be excluded, and assumption of such randomness can indeed serve as a null-model. – Many physiological and morphological differences between species can prevent hybridization. Evidence for niche segregation as the result of reinforcement of reproductive barriers is especially convincing in those cases in which such differences are not found in allopatric but only in sympatric locations. For example, Kawano (2002) has shown this for giant rhinoceros beetles in Southeast Asia. Two closely related species occur in 12 allopatric (i.e., in different areas) and 7 sympatric (i.e., in the same area) locations. In the former, body length and length of genitalia are practically identical, in the latter, they are significantly different, and much more so for the genitalia than the body, convincing evidence that reinforcement is an important factor (and possibly the only one) responsible for niche segregation. - The very detailed studies of communities of Monogenea parasitic on the gills of marine and freshwater fishes by several authors have shown the same. Species use strictly defined microhabitats and have very complex copulatory organs.  This and the fact that fish replicas are available in almost unlimited numbers, makes them ideal ecological models.  Many congeners (species belonging to the same genus) and non-congeners were found on single host species. The maximum number of congeners was nine species. The only limiting factor is space for attachment, since food (blood, mucus, fast regenerating epithelial cells) is in unlimited supply as long as the fish is alive. Various authors, using a variety of statistical methods, have consistently found that species with different copulatory organs may co-occur in the same microhabitat, whereas congeners with identical or very similar copulatory organs are spatially segregated, convincing evidence that reinforcement and not competition is responsible for niche segregation.

For a detailed discussion, especially of competition and reinforcement of reproductive barriers, see

See also
Character displacement
Niche differentiation

References

Ecology
Evolutionary biology